53rd Street Line may refer to:
IND 53rd Street Line, an underground line of the New York City Subway in Manhattan and Queens
53rd Street Line (surface), a former surface transit line in Manhattan, New York City